Băcani is a commune in Vaslui County, Western Moldavia, Romania. It is composed of five villages: Băcani, Băltățeni, Drujești, Suseni and Vulpășeni.

References

Communes in Vaslui County
Localities in Western Moldavia